Juan "Papo" Franceschi (12 January 1947 – 20 October 1990), was a Puerto Rican track and field athlete from Ponce, Puerto Rico.

Biography
Juan "Papo" Franceschi was born in Barrio San Anton, Ponce, Puerto Rico, on 12 January 1947. Franceschi Vega was known as "El Bolido de San Antón". He was a cousin of Otoniel Velez Franceschi, and a track and field runner in Puerto Rico, participating in the 1966 X Juegos CAC Games where he won a gold medal in the 400 meters with a time of 46.7, a new record in the Games. He also won Bronze in the long relay ("relevo largo"). In 1967 he won fourth place at the Panamerican Games in Winnipeg, Manitoba, Canada, with a score of 46.09. He also competed in the 1968 Olympic games in Mexico City. He was shot and killed on 20 October 1990 and is buried at Camposanto Cristo Resucitado in Ponce. He was father to two sons and three daughters.

Awards
In 2000, he was inducted in the Ponce Sports Hall of Fame. He is also recognized at Ponce's Parque de los Ponceños Ilustres in the area of sports. In 2001, Franceschi became the 101st inductee in the Pabellón de la Fama del Deporte de Puerto Rico (Puerto Rican Sports Hall of Fame).

Legacy
 In Ponce's Barrio San Anton, there is street named after him.
 Starting in 1988, his birth city has celebrated a 5K Marathon in his memory.
 Franceschi is honored at the Park of Illustrious Ponce Citizens in Tricentennial Park in Ponce, Puerto Rico.

See also

List of Puerto Ricans
Black history in Puerto Rico

References

External links

1947 births
1990 deaths
Puerto Rican male sprinters
Sportspeople from Ponce, Puerto Rico
Athletes (track and field) at the 1967 Pan American Games
Athletes (track and field) at the 1968 Summer Olympics
Athletes (track and field) at the 1975 Pan American Games
Olympic track and field athletes of Puerto Rico
Pan American Games competitors for Puerto Rico
Central American and Caribbean Games gold medalists for Puerto Rico
Competitors at the 1966 Central American and Caribbean Games
Central American and Caribbean Games medalists in athletics